Raymond George Hoey (born 1946) was Archdeacon of Armagh from 1992 to 2014.

Hoey was educated at Trinity College, Dublin and  ordained in 1973. After a  curacy in Portadown he was the incumbent of Camlough and also chaplain to Archbishop Robin Eames.

References

1946 births
Alumni of Trinity College Dublin
Deans of Armagh
20th-century Irish Anglican priests
21st-century Irish Anglican priests
Living people